General Jörg Vollmer (born 7 September 1957 in Bremen) was a German Army general and since 22 April 2020 was a Commander of the NATO Allied Joint Forces Command Brunssum. He was the Inspector of the Army from 2015 to 2020.

Background
Vollmer entered military service in 1978, and subsequently underwent officer training. Afterwards he studied organizational and economic science at the Helmut Schmidt University of the Armed Forces in Hamburg. Having entered field service in 1982, he held several commands in mechanized infantry units. In 1991, he attended the German general staff officer course and continued to work in the Federal Ministry of Defence, and earned his Master's Degree at the School of Advanced Military Studies in Fort Leavenworth, Kansas, United States.

In 1995, he was made G3 officer (operations) with Armoured Brigade 14 which then was a part of the 5th Armoured Division. A tour of service with SFOR and several other administrative commands followed. Promoted to general, Jörg Vollmer assumed command over Light Infantry Brigade 37 (reflagged as Mechanized Infantry Brigade 37 on April 7, 2009) on October 27, 2006. From January 2009 to October 2009 and from February 2013 to February 2014, he was Regional Commander North with the International Security Assistance Force in Mazār-e Sharīf, Afghanistan. In October 2010, he left Mechanized Infantry Brigade 37, and became chief of staff of the I. German/Dutch Corps.

In October 2011, Vollmer became the commander of the Special Operations Division. In June 2014, Vollmer took the position of Deputy Inspector of the Army and chief of Army Command, the second-highest position in the German Army. On 16 July 2015 Vollmer succeeded Generalleutnant Bruno Kasdorf as Inspector of the Army.

See also
German combat operations in Afghanistan in early 2009

References

Bundeswehr Curriculum Vitae

1957 births
Living people
Military personnel from Bremen
Lieutenant generals of the German Army
German military personnel of the War in Afghanistan (2001–2021)
Recipients of the Badge of Honour of the Bundeswehr
Helmut Schmidt University alumni